German submarine U-165 was a Type IXC U-boat of Nazi Germany's Kriegsmarine built for service during World War II. The keel for this boat was laid down on 30 August 1940 at the Deutsche Schiff- und Maschinenbau AG, Bremen yard as yard number 704. She was launched on 15 August 1941 and commissioned on 3 February 1942 under the command of Fregattenkapitän Eberhard Hoffmann.

The U-boat's service began with training as part of the 4th U-boat Flotilla. She then moved to the 10th flotilla on 1 September 1942 for operations. She sank two ships, totalling , one auxiliary warship of 358 GRT and damaged three others, for 14,499 GRT. She also damaged one auxiliary warship (7,252 GRT).

An RAF aircraft with a Czechoslovak crew sank her on 27 September 1942.

Design
German Type IXC submarines were slightly larger than the original Type IXBs. U-165 had a displacement of  when at the surface and  while submerged. She had two shafts and two  propellers.

U-165 was fitted with six  torpedo tubes (four fitted at the bow and two at the stern), 22 torpedoes, one  SK C/32 naval gun, 180 rounds, and a  SK C/30 as well as a  C/30 anti-aircraft gun. The boat had a complement of forty-eight.

Service history

PatrolRohwer, p.158
The submarine's only patrol took her from Kiel on 7 August 1942, across the North Sea and into the northern Atlantic Ocean via through the gap between Iceland and the Faroe Islands to the Gulf of the St. Lawrence. 

One of the ships was then finished off by U-517.

On 6 September U-165 found convoy QS-33 and during several attacks sank the freighter Aeas and the escort .

On 15 September U-517 attacks convoy SQ-36, and signals U-165 which can attack the next day. U-165 can sink one ship out of the convoy and damage two more ships.

Loss
U-165 had almost reached the French Atlantic ports when on 27 September 1942 an RAF Coastal Command Vickers Wellington 1C on patrol from RAF Talbenny found her on the surface just west of the Bay of Biscay. The Wellington, with serial number Z1147 and code letters KX-Q, belonged to No. 311 Squadron RAF, whose aircrew were Czechoslovaks.

His navigator and bomb aimer, Flt Lt Václav Kadaně, aimed six depth charges at U-165. Their explosions lifted the U-boat out of the water, but she managed to submerge to escape further attack.

Shrapnel wounded three of the Wellington's crew, including the co-pilot, and a fourth crew member lost a finger. The machine gun fire also damaged the aircraft's hydraulic equipment. Študent broke off the attack, and at 19:58 hrs crash-landed the Wellington at St Eval, Cornwall. Two of the wounded Czechoslovak crew were hospitalised. However, the attack succeeded in sinking U-165.

In older sources, the U-165 is listed as being lost to unknown causes, or to have run on a mine.

Summary of raiding history

References

Notes

Citations

Bibliography

External links

German Type IX submarines
U-boats commissioned in 1941
U-boats sunk in 1942
World War II submarines of Germany
World War II shipwrecks in the Atlantic Ocean
1941 ships
Ships built in Bremen (state)
U-boats sunk by Czech aircraft
U-boats sunk by depth charges
Ships lost with all hands
Maritime incidents in September 1942